Jesus Rafael Orono (born August 30, 1958) is a former super flyweight boxing champion from Venezuela.

Amateur career
Born in Patono, Sucre, Orono began as an amateur and compiled a record of 49 wins and 8 losses.

Amateur highlights
Central American Games champion (Medillin, Colombia)
Silver Medal "Copa de los Reyes" (Romania)
Boxan Champion 1977 & 1978
Bronze at the Cordova Cardin, Cuba

Professional boxing career
Orono turned professional in 1979. He captured the vacant WBC super flyweight title in his 11th professional fight, winning a decision over Seung-Hoon Lee the following year. He successfully defended his title three times, before losing it to Chul-Ho Kim in 1981 by KO. He recaptured the title in a 1982 a rematch with a TKO over Kim. Orono defended his belt three more times before losing it to Payao Poontarat by decision in 1983. In 1985 he took on WBA super flyweight title holder Khaosai Galaxy, but lost by a TKO. Orono retired from boxing in 1988.

Professional boxing record

See also 
 List of super-flyweight boxing champions

References

External links

1958 births
People from Sucre (state)
Super-flyweight boxers
World super-flyweight boxing champions
World Boxing Association champions
Living people
Venezuelan male boxers
Central American and Caribbean Games gold medalists for Venezuela
Competitors at the 1978 Central American and Caribbean Games
Central American and Caribbean Games medalists in boxing